Steven Frank Gregory Bullen (born 12 July 1992) is an English cricketer. He made his first-class debut on 7 April 2015 for Leeds/Bradford MCCU against Yorkshire as part of the 2015 Marylebone Cricket Club University Matches. He has also played minor counties cricket for Wiltshire.

Environmental Efforts 
In 2016, Bullen co-founded Environmental Certification Body Greenleaf TDG with Andrew Woodward, an initiative that aims to provide technology and services to help businesses manage their environmental footprint and catalyse the move to a circular, green economy.

References

External links
 

1992 births
Living people
English cricketers
Leeds/Bradford MCCU cricketers
Sportspeople from Watford
Wiltshire cricketers